Väinö Huhtala (born 23 June 1934) is a Finnish rower. He competed in the men's coxed four event at the 1960 Summer Olympics.

References

External links
 

1934 births
Living people
Finnish male rowers
Olympic rowers of Finland
Rowers at the 1960 Summer Olympics
People from Sievi
Sportspeople from North Ostrobothnia
20th-century Finnish people